Coningham is a rural residential locality in the local government area (LGA) of Kingborough in the Hobart LGA region of Tasmania. The 2016 census recorded a population of 253 for the state suburb of Coningham.

History 
Coningham was gazetted as a locality in 1965.

Geography
The waters of North-West Bay form the northern boundary, and D'Entrecasteaux Channel the eastern.

Road infrastructure 
Route B68 (Channel Highway) passes to the west. Old Station Road and Coningham Road provide access to the locality.

References

Towns in Tasmania
Localities of Kingborough Council